Daniel Alberto Passarella (born 25 May 1953) is an Argentine former footballer and manager, who is considered one of the greatest defenders of all time. As a player for Argentina, he was part of two FIFA World Cup–winning teams; he captained his nation to victory at the 1978 World Cup which Argentina hosted, and was also part of the winning squad in 1986.

Although playing as a centre-back, Passarella was also a proficient goalscorer; at one point, he was football's highest-scoring defender, with 134 goals in 451 matches, a record which was subsequently broken by Dutch player Ronald Koeman. In 2004, Passarella was named one of the 125 greatest living footballers by Pelé at a FIFA awards ceremony. In 2007, The Times placed him at 36th in their list of the 50 hardest footballers in history. In 2017, he was named as the 56th best player by FourFourTwo in their list of the 100 all-time greatest footballers. As a manager, he coached the Argentina and Uruguay national teams, among several club sides.

After his playing and coaching career, Passarella also served as the president of River Plate for four years, after winning the elections in December 2009.

Club career 

Passarella was born in Chacabuco, Buenos Aires. He started his career at Sarmiento of Junín, Buenos Aires in 1971. He played there until 1973, when he joined River Plate. Playing for Los Millonarios, he was constantly starting to be called up to the Argentina national team.

After his good performances at the 1982 World Cup, he joined Serie A side Fiorentina in the summer of 1982. At the Italian club, he scored 11 goals during the 1985–86 season, a record for a defender at the time, although the goal tally was surpassed by Marco Materazzi in the 2000–01 season.

In 1986, he joined Internazionale, where he ended his Italian playing career in 1988. After his successful spell in the Serie A, he returned to River Plate, where he played until his retirement.

He was called "El Gran Capitán" ('the Great Captain', the nickname of the Argentinian independence hero, José de San Martín),"El Kaiser" (an allusion to German defender Franz Beckenbauer) or "El Caudillo" ('the Chief') because of his leadership ability, his passion, and his organisational prowess on the field. He was a defender who often joined the attack, and helped generate and finish offensive plays. He was the all-time highest-scoring defender, with 134 goals in 451 matches, a record that was later broken by Dutch player Ronald Koeman.

His aerial game was effective both defensively and in attack. Despite his average height of 1.73 m, he frequently scored headers. He was also a noted free-kick and penalty specialist. Furthermore, he was known for using elbows against rivals whilst managing to avoid the referee's gaze.

International career 
As one of the pillars of the Argentina national football team, he would captain the team during the 1978 World Cup held in Argentina. He was the first Argentine player to hold the World Cup, as it was handed to him first when Argentina won the final. During the qualifying rounds of the 1986 World Cup, Passarella contributed to the goal which ensured Argentina's qualification in the final minutes of their match against Peru by allowing teammate Ricardo Gareca to score.

A bout of enterocolitis caused him to miss the 1986 World Cup in Mexico. He was replaced in the first team by defender José Luis Brown and failed to regain his place after recovering from illness. Passarella had a fractious relationship with captain Diego Maradona and coach Carlos Bilardo during the tournament. He later claimed Bilardo and Maradona made certain that he was sidelined; although he is the first and so far only player to feature in two Argentina World Cupwinning squads, he did not play any of the matches in 1986, not even as a substitute.

Coaching career 

After the end of his playing career, he returned to River Plate as a manager and guided them to three national championships, in 1989–90, 1991 and 1993. Thereafter, Passarella was appointed as the coach of the Argentina national team in 1994, replacing Alfio Basile. He was in charge of the team during the 1998 World Cup qualification campaign and later the competition itself, which was held in France. As the Argentina team head, Passarella had appointed a close friend and a fellow 1978 world champion, Américo Gallego, as his assistant coach. He banned long hair, earrings and homosexuals in the national team, leading to disputes with several players. Fernando Redondo and Claudio Caniggia eventually refused to play for Passarella and were excluded from his squad.

Argentina's performances never reached the expected heights during the 1998 World Cup; the team was eliminated in the quarter-final after a last minute 2–1 defeat to the Netherlands. After the elimination, Passarella left the post and was replaced by compatriot Marcelo Bielsa. Subsequently, Passarella became the manager of the Uruguay national team, but he left the post during the 2002 World Cup qualification process. Afterwards, Passarella had a brief and unsuccessful stint as the coach of Italian side Parma in 2001, where he was ultimately sacked after losing all of his five matches.

In 2003, he won the Mexican league title with Monterrey. In March 2004, he was named by Pelé as one of the 125 greatest living footballers. He was then hired as coach of Corinthians in Brazil, but was fired after a few months after a spell of bad results.

On 9 January 2006, he was appointed River Plate coach again after 12 years to occupy the vacancy left by Reinaldo Merlo's sudden departure. On 15 November 2007, he resigned as coach after River was beaten by penalties by Arsenal de Sarandí in the semi-final of the 2007 Copa Sudamericana.

In the summer of 2018, after publicly expressing interest in returning he was widely seen as the frontrunner to become the new manager of Monterrey for a second stint after the departure of Antonio Mohamed but the club ultimately decided to appoint Diego Alonso.

Administrative career 
Passarella was elected as president of River Plate in December 2009. The club was in poor financial shape when Passarella took charge. River Plate were relegated for the first time in the club's 110-year history in 2011. Passarella was alleged to have engaged in fraud during his presidency.

Career statistics

Club

International 

 Scores and results list Argentina's goal tally first, score column indicates score after each Passarella goal.

Honours

Player 
River Plate

 Primera División (6): 1975 Metropolitano, 1975 Nacional, 1977 Metropolitano, 1979 Metropolitano, 1979 Nacional, 1980 Metropolitano, 1981 Nacional

Argentina
 FIFA World Cup: 1978, 1986

Individual
 Argentine Footballer of the Year: 1976
 FIFA World Cup All-Star Team: 1978
 FIFA 100: 2004
 Golden Foot Legends Award: 2015
 AFA Team of All Time (published 2015)
 World Soccer: The 100 Greatest Footballers of All Time
 Fiorentina All-time XI
 IFFHS All-time Men's B Dream Team: 2021
 IFFHS South America Men's Team of All Time: 2021

Manager 
River Plate
 Primera División: 1989–90, Apertura 1991, Apertura 1993

Monterrey
 Mexican Primera División: Clausura 2003

Individual
 South American Coach of the Year: 1997

President 
River Plate
 Primera B Nacional: 2011–12

References

External links 

 
 Biography at Planetworldcup.com
 IFFHS Top Division Goal Scorers of all time among defensive players
 Comprehensive season stats at RSSSF
  
 Profile and Statistics at Futbolistasblogspotcom.blogspot.com 

1953 births
Living people
Sportspeople from Buenos Aires Province
Association football central defenders
Association football sweepers
Argentine footballers
Argentine football managers
Argentine expatriate footballers
Argentine expatriate sportspeople in Italy
Argentina international footballers
Argentine people of Italian descent
FIFA World Cup-winning captains
FIFA World Cup-winning players
FIFA 100
1978 FIFA World Cup players
1982 FIFA World Cup players
1986 FIFA World Cup players
1979 Copa América players
Argentine Primera División players
Club Atlético Sarmiento footballers
Club Atlético River Plate footballers
Serie A players
ACF Fiorentina players
Inter Milan players
Club Atlético River Plate managers
Mexico national football team managers
Uruguay national football team managers
Serie A managers
Parma Calcio 1913 managers
Sport Club Corinthians Paulista managers
Expatriate football managers in Italy
1995 King Fahd Cup managers
1998 FIFA World Cup managers
1995 Copa América managers
1997 Copa América managers
Expatriate footballers in Italy
Expatriate football managers in Brazil
Argentine football chairmen and investors
Medalists at the 1996 Summer Olympics
Olympic silver medalists for Argentina
Olympic medalists in football
Argentine expatriate sportspeople in Brazil
Argentine expatriate sportspeople in Uruguay
Expatriate football managers in Uruguay
C.F. Monterrey managers
Expatriate football managers in Mexico
Argentine expatriate sportspeople in Mexico